Baizhuang (Mandarin: 白庄镇) is a town in Xunhua Salar Autonomous County, Haidong, Qinghai, China. In 2010, Baizhuang had a total population of 20,919 people: 10,516 males and 10,403 females: 6,058 under 14 years old, 13,419 aged between 15 and 64 and 1,442 over 65 years old.

References 
 

Haidong
Township-level divisions of Qinghai